Kuhsaran Rural District is a rural district (dehestan) in the Central District of Qaem Shahr County, Mazandaran Province, Iran. At the 2006 census, its population was 5,486, in 1,625 families. The rural district has 8 villages.

References 

Rural Districts of Mazandaran Province
Qaem Shahr County